Athalia (HWV 52) is an English-language oratorio composed by George Frideric Handel to a libretto by Samuel Humphreys based on the play Athalie by Jean Racine. The work was commissioned in 1733 for the Publick Act in Oxford – a commencement ceremony of the University of Oxford, which had offered Handel an honorary doctorate (an honour he declined). The story is based on that of the Biblical queen Athaliah.
Athalia, Handel's third oratorio in English, was completed on 7 June 1733, and first performed on 10 July 1733 at the Sheldonian Theatre in Oxford. The Bee (14 July 1733) reported that the performance was "performed with the utmost Applause, and is esteemed equal to the most celebrated of that Gentleman's Performances: there were 3700 Persons present".

Athaliah was first given in London on 1 April 1735 at Covent Garden theatre.

Dramatis personae

Synopsis

Athalia, daughter of King Ahab of Israel and Queen Jezebel, had been married to Jehoram, King of Judah. After her husband's death, Athalia was determined to stamp out the Jewish line of kings descended from David. She caused, so she believed, all the heirs to the throne to be murdered. She took the throne and ruled Judah herself, and began to devote the country to the idolatrous worship of Baal instead of the God of Israel. However, the child Joas, rightful heir to the throne, had been saved from death by Joad the High Priest and his wife Josabeth and raised as their own son under the name "Eliakim".

Act 1

In the Temple during a religious festival, the Jewish people offer their prayers to God. The High Priest Joad laments Queen Athalia's blasphemy in seeking to force the worship of Baal. All join in prayers for deliverance from her tyrannous rule. At the Palace, the Queen is disturbed by a dream she has had of a young boy dressed as a Jewish priest plunging a dagger into her heart. The high priest of Baal, Mathan, calms her by saying it was only a dream and suggests she have the Temple searched. Abner, Captain of the Guards, loyal to the God of Israel, goes to the Temple to warn of the upcoming search just as Joad the High Priest and his wife Josabeth are preparing to reveal to the nation that the boy "Eliakim" whom they have raised as their own son is in fact Joas, descendant of David and rightful King. Josabeth is alarmed and despondent at the news of the search but her husband tells her to trust in God.

Act 2

The Jewish people in the Temple offer magnificent songs of praise to God. Athalia enters and is alarmed to see in "Eliakim" the very image of the child who stabbed her in her dream. She interrogates the boy and when he tells her he is an orphan she offers to adopt him, but he rejects with revulsion the idea of such close association with an idolator such as she. Athalia is enraged and departs, vowing that she will have the child regardless. Once again Josabeth, close to despair, is counseled by Joad to trust God. The chorus comment that the guilty are sure to be punished.

Act 3

Joad, inspired by God, prophesies the downfall of Athalia. He and Josabeth explain to the boy ""Eliakim" that he is really Joas, rightful King, and crown him, to the acclaim of the people. Athalia enters, demanding that the boy be given to her, and when she learns that he has been crowned, orders the treason to be punished, but her soldiers have all deserted her. Even Mathan, High Priest of Baal, declares that the God of Israel has triumphed. Athalia knows she is doomed, but goes to her death declaring that she will seek vengeance even from the grave. All praise the rightful King and the true God.

Theme of the libretto

The biblical story of Athalia, with its tale of deposing a usurping and tyrannous monarch, was used by supporters of the Jacobite cause as justification for restoring the Stuart monarchy. Oxford was then a centre of High church and Jacobite sentiment, which has caused the choice of subject for this oratorio by a supporter of the Hanoverian monarchy such as Handel to seem strange to some writers. However the libretto by Samuel Humphreys alters Racine's original by placing great emphasis on removing "idolatry" from the land, clearly referring to removing Catholic influence, and is thus supportive of the Protestant Hanoverian monarchy. The subject of the oratorio was most likely a conscious choice on Handel's part of a subject that would appeal to the Jacobite supporters in Oxford without being disloyal to his Hanoverian patrons.

Musical features

The work is scored for strings, 2 recorders (or flutes), 2 oboes, 2 bassoons, 2 horns, 2 trumpets, timpani and continuo. Athalia shows flexibility and originality in form on Handel's part, combining solos with chorus in new ways. Its vivid characterisation through music contributed to its immense success at its premiere.

Summary

Recordings

See also
List of oratorios by George Frideric Handel

References
Citations

Sources

External links

Full-text libretto hosted by Stanford University.

1733 compositions
Adaptations of works by Jean Racine
Jacobitism
Music in Oxford
Oratorios by George Frideric Handel
Oratorios based on the Bible